Marianas Baptist Academy is a private Baptist Christian school in Dandan, Saipan, Northern Mariana Islands. It serves grades 7 to 12. It was established in 1984.

References

External links
Marianas Baptist Academy

Baptist schools in the United States
Christian schools in the Northern Mariana Islands
High schools in the Northern Mariana Islands
Private middle schools in the United States
Private high schools in the United States
Schools in the Northern Mariana Islands